Rex Hillier is a Canadian politician. He was elected to represent the district of Conception Bay South in the Newfoundland and Labrador House of Assembly in a 2014 by-election. He is a member of the Liberal Party. Before being elected, Hiller was a member of the Conception Bay South Town Council as a Councillor. He was the Liberal nominee in the district of Topsail-Paradise for the 2015 provincial election but lost to Paul Davis. He had previously lost the Liberal nomination in Conception Bay South for the 2015 election.

Election results

|-

|-

|-

|}

}
|-

|-

|align="right"|2034
|align="right"|47.58
|align="right"|-21.61
|-

|NDP
|Cameron Mercer-Maillet
|align="right"|130
|align="right"|3.05
|align="right"|-21.01

|}

References

External links
 Rex Hillier

Liberal Party of Newfoundland and Labrador MHAs
People from Conception Bay South
Year of birth missing (living people)
Living people
21st-century Canadian politicians